Raigad may refer to:
Raigad district in Maharashtra, India
Raigad fort
Raigad (Lok Sabha constituency) in Maharashtra, India
Raigarh, district in  Chhattisgarh, India